Friedrich Ludwig Abresch (29 December 1699, Homburg - 1782) was a Dutch philologist of German origins.

Born in Homburg, the reasons that led him to move to the Netherlands are uncertain. He visited the college in Herborn and the University of Utrecht. He was a scholar of Karl Andreas Duker and Arnold Drakenborch. However he followed rather the teachings of Tiberius Hemsterhuis and engaged in Greek literature as far as his work allowed this.

In 1723 he was appointed co-rector, in 1725 rector in Middelburg. After the death of his first wife, he remarried a rich woman from Zwolle and willingly accepted the offer to take the local rectorate. He remained in office until his death in 1782.

Publications

 several articles in Miscellaneae observationes, beginning with volume 7.
 Animadversiones in Aeschylum libri II, 1743
 Lectionum Aristaenetearum libri II, 1749
 Virorum aliquot eruditorum in Arist. coniecturae, 1752
 Dilucidationes Thucydideae 1753, 1755
 Animadversiones in Aeschylum libri III, 1763

Sources

 Allgemeine Deutsche Biographie - online version

1699 births
1782 deaths
Dutch philologists
German philologists
People from Homburg, Saarland